South Wayne Historic District may refer to:

South Wayne Historic District (Fort Wayne, Indiana), listed on the National Register of Historic Places in Allen County, Indiana
South Wayne Historic District (Wayne, Pennsylvania), listed on the National Register of Historic Places in Delaware County, Pennsylvania